The Free French Naval Air Service (Aéronavale française libre) was the naval aviation arm of Free French Naval Forces during the Second World War.

The Free French Naval Air Service supported Free French Naval and Allied forces in overseas fronts (North Africa, Middle East, etc.) and later supported the Free French Navy during Allied advances into French territory after the Battle of Normandy.

The markings of the Free French Naval Air Service were regular French roundels overpainted with an anchor on the fuselage, and the French tricolor on the rudder.

It operated all the French naval aircraft, seaplanes and flying boats, that escaped from German-occupied France after the Battle of France, together with naval aircraft from the French colonies that declared allegiance to de Gaulle's Free French Forces, and aircraft donated by the British and Americans.  It carried out Marine patrols and operations against Axis forces in France during 1944-45. It formed the basis for the postwar French Naval Air Service.

Aircraft of the Free French Naval Air Service
 Breguet 521 Bizerte
 C.A.M.S. 55.10
 Latécoère 298
 Latécoère 611
 Lioré et Olivier LeO H-47
 Loire 130M
 Mureaux-Besson MB 411
 Potez-CAMS 141
 Douglas A-24B 
 Hawker Hurricane Mk. IIC

See also
 Free French Air Force

Free French Forces
Air units and formations of France in World War II
French Naval Aviation